The Eritrean Air Force (ERAF) is the air service branch of the Eritrean Defence Forces.

History 
The Eritrean Air Force was established shortly after Eritrean War of Independence in 1994. It was first established by Commander Habtezion Hadgu, who used to be an Ethiopian Air force pilot during the Mengistu regime, and later defected to the Eritrean People Liberation Front (EPLF) in the late 1980s. When the air force was established, Commander Hadgu called many officers who served in the Ethiopian Air force, including Col. Abraham (Chief of Staff), Col. Melake, Col. Mesfin, Col. Dr. Efrem and some others, like Major Shekay who came from Lebanon. His deputy was a veteran EPLF fighter, a Major General, Aka. Wedi Kahsay until he was sent to the northern zone as a commander of a regiment in the army. The director of Air Force Intelligence and Administration was also a veteran EPLF fighter, Col. Mussie Lebassi, a member of the 72nd intelligence unit of the EPLF, which was dissolved in 1994. Commander Habtezion and Col. Mussie were later suspended form the air force. Eventually, the air force was taken over by Major General Teklay Habteselasie who is also the commander of the Sawa military training camp.

The make-up of the original force was composed of aircraft that were abandoned by the defeated Ethiopian armed forces. The Eritrean Air Force is a smaller branch of the Eritrean Defence Forces. Several MiG-21s which were taken from the Ethiopian Air Force are believed to be no longer in service. The main airbase is Asmara AP, which is a combined civil/military base. Serials are sometimes, but not always, worn with 'ERAF' in front of the digits.

The air force has experienced a number of notable defections in recent years.  In 2012 two high-ranking officers flew the air force's only luxury airplane out of the country to Saudi Arabia and sought asylum.

1998–2000 Eritrean-Ethiopian War 
Expansion of the Eritrean Air Force (ERAF) did not occur until the Eritrean-Ethiopian War in which the two air forces fought for superiority. In a sort of arms race Eritrea responded to Ethiopia's purchase of Su-27s with a purchase of MiG-29s. In 2000 the ERAF bought eight Su-25s from Georgia, and six more MiG-29s from Moldova. In 2003 Eritrea also acquired several Su-27s.
The Eritrean Air force trained and grew enormously in a short period and was able to challenge the Ethiopian army in the 1998 border conflict. Commander Habtezion, along with young Air Force pilots, retaliated in short time after the Ethiopian Air force, led by popular pilot General Bezabh Petros – in captivity during the liberation war and recaptured again in the 1998 war – bombed Asmara.

Organization

Structure 

 Headquarters of the Eritrean Air Force (Asmara, Eritrea)
 Asmara Airport
 Assab International Airport
 Sawa Airport (Forto, Eritrea)
 Massawa International Airport (Massawa, Eritrea)

Commanders

Aircraft

Current inventory 

Due to the lack of technical expertise with Russian aircraft, the Eritrean government maintained a contractual agreement with a Russian parastatal defense company to help upkeep its fleet of Russian manufactured fighter aircraft such as the MiG-29 and Su-27. However this agreement ended since it was in violation of United Nations Security Council Resolution 1907 barring military technical assistance to Eritrea. It is believed that Eritrea's fleet of Russian fighter aircraft is suffering from a chronic lack of maintenance and as a result are rarely flown.

References

Further reading 
 

Military of Eritrea
Military aviation in Africa